The Union de pharmacologie scientifique appliquée (UPSA) is a French pharmaceutical group, independent from 1935 until acquisition by Bristol Myers Squibb in 1994. The company is now owned by Taisho Pharmaceutical.

It was founded in Agen in 1935 by Dr Camille Bru. Following the founder's death in 1958 the group was run by his son Jean Bru until his own death 1989, and then by Jean Bru's widow Nicole Bru, née Magniez, from 1989 to 1994. The Fondation Bru administers the charitable and cultural interests of the family.

On July 1, 2019, the sale of UPSA to Taisho Pharmaceutical is finalized. However, UPSA retains its status as a company and its flagship brands remain manufactured in France on its site.

References

Bristol Myers Squibb
Pharmaceutical companies of France
Pharmaceutical companies established in 1935
Companies based in Nouvelle-Aquitaine